Chris Collins is an American guitarist and songwriter. He is best known as the first vocalist of the progressive metal band Majesty, which later became Dream Theater.

The Majesty Days 
Collins grew up on Long Island with fellow future Dream Theater members John Petrucci, John Myung and Kevin Moore. While those three went off to colleges to study music, Collins decided to join The United States Marine Corps. However, his enlistment in the USMC never happened, as the very week that he was supposed to go to boot camp, Collins received a phone call from John Petrucci stating that they would like to record an album, and that he should audition for the band. Collins recorded vocals for six tracks that the band made into their first demo tape, The Majesty Demos.

Collins wound up frustrating his bandmates with his poor vocal range, bad live performances and on-stage behavior. Eventually Collins left the band and that led to a mutual decision to part company, citing that he was not an appropriate choice for lead vocalist and that the band would never be a success with him in it.

Later career
Collins has worked with local tributes such as Snowblind, Never Enough, Scorched Earth, Speak of the Devil, and Live After Death. Collins also recorded vocals for the US progressive metal band Oblivion Knight whose album, Oblivion Knight, was released on Steel Legacy records. Oblivion Knight was the original band formed by now OSV bass player Steve Sexton.

References

External links
 Myspace page
 Entry at AllMusic

Dream Theater members
American heavy metal singers
American male singers
American rock guitarists
American male guitarists
Living people
Record producers from New York (state)
Singers from New York (state)
Year of birth missing (living people)
Guitarists from New York (state)
Roadrunner Records artists